Brooklyn Bridge is a documentary film on the history of the Brooklyn Bridge. It was produced by Ken Burns, Roger Sherman, Buddy Squires, and Amy Stechler in 1981. The film included interviews with personalities such as The New York Times architectural critic Paul Goldberger and writer Arthur Miller plus film clips featuring Bugs Bunny (Bowery Bugs) and Frank Sinatra. The film was nominated for an Academy Award for Best Documentary Feature. It was narrated by historian David McCullough, who wrote the 1972 book the film was based on.

The film was rebroadcast nationally twice: on January 29, 1992, preceding the then-new documentary from Burns, Empire of the Air: The Men Who Made Radio, and on October 21, 2002, as part of Ken Burns: America's Stories.

Accolades

 Academy Award nomination, 1982
 Guggenheim Fellowship
 Christopher Award, 1983
 Erik Barnouw Award: Historical Films
 Festival Dei Popoli, special mention
 American Film Festival, Blue Ribbon
 CINE Gold Eagle
 MOMA/New Directors, selection
 Chicago International Film Festival
 FILMEX, selection
 Birmingham Film Festival, 1st in category

References

External links
Brooklyn Bridge at KenBurns.com
Official site on PBS
 
Excerpt from PBS America on YouTube

1981 films
Films directed by Ken Burns
American documentary television films
Documentary films about New York City
1981 documentary films
Brooklyn Bridge
1980s English-language films
1980s American films